Stanley Stephens (16 April 1883 – 7 September 1965) was an Australian cricketer. He played three first-class cricket matches for Victoria between 1914 and 1915.

See also
 List of Victoria first-class cricketers

References

External links
 

1883 births
1965 deaths
Australian cricketers
Victoria cricketers
Cricketers from Melbourne